Leon Forrest Higgins was an American businessperson and politician from Maine. Higgins, a Republican from Brewer, served as an Alderman in 1900, in the Maine House of Representatives in 1913-16 and in the Maine Senate (1917-1920). During his final term (1919-1920), Higgins was elected Senate President.

Higgins owned a successful insurance business and was an incorporator of Brewer Savings Bank.

References

Year of birth missing
Year of death missing
People from Brewer, Maine
Maine city council members
Republican Party members of the Maine House of Representatives
Presidents of the Maine Senate
Republican Party Maine state senators
Businesspeople from Maine